The Sanford-Townsend Band was a rock and roll band that scored a hit single in 1977 with "Smoke from a Distant Fire".

History
The Sanford-Townsend Band featured keyboardists Ed Sanford (from Montgomery, Alabama) and Johnny Townsend (from Tuscaloosa, Alabama), who previously worked together in a Tuscaloosa-based band called Heart (not to be confused with the band of the same name fronted by Ann and Nancy Wilson from Seattle/Vancouver).

After reuniting in Los Angeles, Sanford and Townsend signed a publishing deal with Chappell Music and began writing songs, most notably "Peacemaker" for Loggins and Messina, which was co-written by Sanford and Townsend with Kenny Loggins.

Their 1976 self-titled album, recorded at the famous Muscle Shoals Sound Studio in Alabama, started getting attention when "Smoke from a Distant Fire" reached No. 9 on the Billboard Hot 100, No. 9 in Cash Box, and No. 13 in Record World.  The album was retitled with the name of the hit song and re-released as just by Sanford & Townsend. The band supported the song by opening for Fleetwood Mac on their Rumours tour, as well as concerts with The Marshall Tucker Band, Charlie Daniels, Jimmy Buffett, Foreigner, Heart and others.

The band's follow-up albums, Duo-Glide (also credited to Sanford & Townsend) and Nail Me To The Wall (back to the full band name again), were significantly less successful.  Sanford and Townsend returned to their careers as session musicians and songwriters.

The band's long-time bassist, Jerry Rightmer, died in 2007 at the age of 57 from cirrhosis of the liver, brought on by Hepatitis C.

Former lead guitarist Roger Johnson currently works with his wife in publishing. He had spent 25 years in the film industry as a video technician and editor subsequent to his time in the Sanford-Townsend Band.

In 2008, John Townsend formed the Toler/Townsend Band with Dan Toler.  Townsend's tenor voice remains substantially unchanged from thirty years prior.

Principal band members
John Wayne Townsend: lead vocals, keyboards
Ed Sanford: keyboards, vocals
Roger Johnson: lead guitar, backing vocals
Otis Hale: guitar, woodwinds, backing vocals
Jerry Rightmer: bass, backing vocals
Jim Varley: drums

Discography

Albums
 Sanford Townsend Band (1976)
 Smoke from a Distant Fire (1977) (Credited to just Sanford & Townsend) – US No. 57
 Duo-Glide (1978) (Credited to just Sanford & Townsend) – US No. 92
 Nail Me to the Wall (1979)

Singles

References

External links
 [ Allmusic entry]
 "Smoke From A Distant Fire" Songfacts entry
 Johnny Townsend site
 Johnny Townsend Myspace
 

Rock music groups from Alabama
American southern rock musical groups
American soul musical groups
Warner Records artists